TRNA (cytosine34-C5)-methyltransferase (hTrm4 Mtase, hTrm4 methyltransferase, hTrm4 (gene), tRNA:m5C-methyltransferase) is an enzyme with systematic name S-adenosyl-L-methionine:tRNA (cytosine34-C5)-methyltransferase. This enzyme catalyses the following chemical reaction

 S-adenosyl-L-methionine + cytosine34 in tRNA precursor  S-adenosyl-L-homocysteine + 5-methylcytosine34 in tRNA precursor

The human enzyme is specific for C5-methylation of cytosine34 in tRNA precursors.

References

External links 
 

EC 2.1.1